Sainte-Clotilde, Quebec is a municipality in the Jardins de Napierville Regional County Municipality in Quebec, Canada.

Sainte-Clotilde may also refer to:

 Sainte-Clotilde, Paris, a basilica church
 Sainte-Clotilde-de-Beauce, Quebec, Canada
 Sainte-Clotilde-de-Horton, Quebec, Canada
 A neighborhood in Saint-Denis, Réunion

See also
 Santa Clotilde, a village on São Tomé Island, São Tomé and Príncipe
 Clotilde (disambiguation)